Mohamed Sylla (22 February 1971 – 9 June 2010) was a Guinean professional footballer who played as a forward.

Club career
Sylla started his career with local team Hafia Conakry. scoring many goals at Gabonese league side USM Libreville he caught the eye of Dutch side Willem II. He was the first Guinean footballer to play in the Netherlands and stayed six years in Tilburg before moving on to the lower French leagues and short spells in Scotland and Greece. He famously scored two goals for Willem II in an away game at FC Twente played in the snow; it is said it was the first time he ever saw snow.

International career
Sylla played for the Guinea national team for several years.

Death
Sylla died on 9 June 2010 in a hospital in Marseille, after a long battle against lung and pancreatic cancer.

Personal life
His son Abdoul Karim Sylla is also a professional footballer.

External links
 
 Chamois Niort profile

References

1971 births
2010 deaths
Sportspeople from Conakry
Association football forwards
Guinean footballers
Guinea international footballers
Guinea youth international footballers
1994 African Cup of Nations players
1998 African Cup of Nations players
Expatriate footballers in Gabon
Eredivisie players
Ligue 1 players
Ligue 2 players
Scottish Football League players
Super League Greece players
Hafia FC players
USM Libreville players
Willem II (football club) players
FC Martigues players
Ayr United F.C. players
Paniliakos F.C. players
Chamois Niortais F.C. players
FC Istres players
Stade Tunisien players
Guinean expatriate footballers
Guinean expatriate sportspeople in the Netherlands
Expatriate footballers in the Netherlands
Guinean expatriate sportspeople in France
Expatriate footballers in France
Guinean expatriate sportspeople in Scotland
Expatriate footballers in Scotland
Guinean expatriate sportspeople in Greece
Expatriate footballers in Greece
Guinean expatriate sportspeople in Tunisia
Expatriate footballers in Tunisia